Vojtěch Myška (born 16 March 2004) is a Czech footballer who currently plays as a goalkeeper for Viktoria Žižkov.

Career statistics

Club

Notes

References

2004 births
Living people
Czech footballers
Association football goalkeepers
Czech National Football League players
FK Teplice players
FK Viktoria Žižkov players